The Bridgeport Purple Knights are the athletic teams that represent the University of Bridgeport, located in Bridgeport, Connecticut, in NCAA Division II intercollegiate sports. The Purple Knights compete as members of the Central Atlantic Collegiate Conference for most sports; the gymnastics program is part of the Eastern College Athletic Conference.

Knights Field is a 950-seat multipurpose stadium located in Bridgeport, Connecticut. It is primarily used as the soccer and lacrosse stadium of the Purple Knights.

Varsity teams

Individual sports

Gymnastics
In 2012, The University of Bridgeport women's gymnastics team won their fourth straight USA Gymnastics Collegiate National Championships. Also, in 2013 UB women's gymnastics team won their fifth consecutive USA Gymnastics Collegiate National Championship.

Soccer

Seth Roland was head coach of the soccer team from 1987 to 1992.

National championships

Team

References

External links